John Gilbert Presslie Barnes is a British computer scientist best known for his role in developing and publicising the programming language Ada. He is the primary inventor of and protagonist for the Ada Rendezvous mechanism.

Barnes studied mathematics at University of Cambridge and later worked at Imperial Chemical Industries (ICI). He was an industrial fellow at Wolfson College, Oxford in the very late 1970s or early 1980s, most likely at the suggestion of Professor Tony Hoare.

Before working on the Ada design team, while at ICI, he designed and implemented a dialect of the language ALGOL, named Real-Time Language 2 (RTL/2) for real-time computing.

Barnes was awarded an honorary Doctor of Philosophy (Ph.D.) from the University of York in 2006.

Publications

Year of birth missing (living people)
Living people
British computer scientists
Imperial Chemical Industries people
Alumni of the University of Cambridge
Fellows of Wolfson College, Oxford
Ada (programming language)